is a Japanese manga series written by Yun Kōga and illustrated by Sunao Minakata. It was serialized in Kadokawa Shoten's Newtype magazine between the September 2012 and November 2016 issues and is licensed in English by Seven Seas Entertainment. An anime adaptation directed by Keizō Kusakawa and animated by Diomedéa aired in Japan between April and June 2014. The series is licensed for streaming by Funimation in North America, Madman Entertainment in Australia, and Muse Communication in Southeast Asia and South Asia.

Plot
At a private girls' boarding school, Myōjō Academy, thirteen girls are transferred into the academy's . Of these thirteen students, twelve are assassins from various backgrounds who are all tasked with assassinating the remaining student, a girl named Haru Ichinose. If they succeed, they will be granted any wish they desire, but if they fail, they are expelled from the class. However, one of the assassins, Tokaku Azuma, has sworn to protect Haru from the other assassins.

Characters

No. 1 of Class Black, the protagonist of the story. Tokaku is a distant and cold girl who comes from the infamous Azuma family, a feared family of skilled assassins, and has a blue bob and blue eyes, which are narrower than the other girls'. Despite this however, following a traumatic event in her past, she has never killed anyone before, getting nicknamed a "virgin" by Isuke. She later overcomes this. It is hinted she develops romantic feelings for Haru. After seemingly killing Haru, she wishes to be with her, which is granted after Haru survives her attempt.

No. 13 of Class Black, the second main character. Haru is a bright and cheerful girl, with light red hair in pigtails and amber eyes, who aims to become friends with everyone. She firmly believes in smiling no matter the situation and has proven she isn't completely helpless, since she defeats both Otoya and Sumireko's attempts on her life. She is part of the same clan as Meichi Yuri and has a Queen Bee effect on her as part of it. If she survives Class Black, she is free of the clan's burden on her.

No. 2 of Class Black, a selfish and haughty girl. She is very blunt and quick to express her opinion, and likes to command other people. Isuke's family includes her adoptive gay parents, one being called Eisuke, which is where her name originates. Isuke is the ninth to be expelled after she is dispatched by Tokaku after she overcomes her demons. In the finale, she is shown to be on vacation with her parents, disappointed about her outcome. A recurring gag is that Isuke always sleeps in class, and is always unaware of the fact, which leads to her confusion to her low test scores.

No. 3 of Class Black, the class representative; a quiet, bookish, and somewhat distant girl. She is shown to use both improvised and purposed-made explosives as a weapon. Koko is very strategic with her plans, though she is still defeated by Tokaku and Haru. She is the second to be expelled. In the past, she was responsible for her mentor's death after her explosives went off too early, leading to her calculated approach to assassination. In the finale, she is still on the run from her clan, and her wish was to leave the assassination business.

No. 4 of Class Black, a girl who resembles an elementary-school student. She has flowing cyan hair and always carries around a pink teddy bear. She is almost always with Chitaru, who helped her when she got lost. Despite her young psychique, she is quite clever and is revealed to be the assassin called Angel's Trumpet, who was the one responsible for killing the daughter of Chitaru's mentor. She carries a poison gun in her teddy bear, which she uses on Shiena. During the play Romeo and Juliet, Chitaru stabs her, only for Nio to tell her that her wish was to forever be with her. In the finale, she is fully healed and supports Chitaru's recovery in hospital. She is the fifth to be expelled.

No. 5 of Class Black, a cheerful girl and slightly scatterbrained girl who wears glasses and has a beige and brown color scheme. She is in charge of the play Romeo and Juliet. She is the only student who doesn't get their own episode arc, as she is poisoned by Hitsugi early on and is expelled due to health reasons. She is also the only student who doesn't have their own outro song. In the finale, she is seen hacking into Myojo Academy to reveal Class Black's secrets. She is part of a group of bullied children. Her wish was unknown. She is the fourth to be expelled.

No. 6 of Class Black, a tomboyish yet fashionable girl who is always shown eating pocky. Haruki is rather carefree, calm and relaxed—to the point where she even views her own death in a calm fashion—but is sensitive about her adoptive family, in which she has many siblings, and wants to keep them protected and safe at all costs. Haruki is shown to go to extremes in order to achieve her goals—when she learnt from Nio that her own death would still ensure her wish was granted even if she failed to kill Haru, Haruki set up a trap with the intention of taking her own life. Though she survived, Haruki was only merely disappointed about her failure. Haruki is the third student of Class Black to be expelled. Following her expulsion, she works as a construction worker and studies to get into college.

No. 7 of Class Black, a somewhat sly girl who likes being physically active and fit. She has short cyan hair. She has a thing for games and bases her assassination attempt around playing cards and the pool. She celebrates her birthday in the anime. Her wish was to find a cure to her Highlander Syndrome, which prevents her body from aging and has kept her alive for so long that she is unsure exactly how old she is. Following her expulsion, she visits her old lover's grave to pay respects.

No. 8 of Class Black, dubbed the "Jack the Ripper of the 21st Century" outside of Myōjō Academy for her serial killer antics, Otoya is a sadist who hides her true nature under the guise of an extremely playful girl. She uses similarity attraction to gain Haru's trust and has an in-depth knowledge of flora. She is aroused by the sight of blood, judging herself to be similar to a spider. She is the first to be expelled, but she later escapes jail to try again, though she is quickly caught by Sumireko and is shown to be still in jail in the final episode.

No. 9 of Class Black, a girl with a demeanor that is both princely and mature. She has red hair and is always around Hitsugi, who she protects. She doesn't have a wish and mainly joined Class Black to find Angel's Trumpet, who killed her mentor's daughter. As such, she doesn't target Haru. She uses swords and is a master swordfighter. After stabbing Hitsugi after finding out she is Angel's Trumpet and after discovering her wish, she drinks a vial of poison to be with her. She survives and she is seen recovering in the last episode. She is the sixth to be expelled.
 / 

No. 10 of Class Black, Nio is an energetic and upbeat girl with a knack for peeping into other people's businesses, though she occasionally shows a more dangerous side. Nio is the real de facto president of the class and is actually a real student of Myojo. She doesn't get involved with the assassinations until only she, Haru and Tokaku remain. She is a master of disguise and sports a red dragon tattoo on her back as a symbol of the Kuzunoha Clan, who are the vicious enemies of the Azumas. She is the eleventh and final expelled student. She is shown to have survived Tokaku's attack and continues to work under Meichi.

No. 11 of Class Black, a girl with a frail body who is the daughter of a company CEO. It is revealed that, much like Haru, she had been targeted most of her life, and had lost her limbs in an attack. Sumireko's family name is famous in Japan and has special allowances to have her own desk and chair which irritates the other students. She is the tenth student to be expelled after Haru makes her fall from a building during her assassination attempt. She goes back to her normal life following her expulsion.
 / 

No. 12 of Class Black, Mahiru is a shy and timid girl who often has troubles speaking for herself. She is easily subject to bullying, and is often defenseless. However, when the sun sets, Mahiru's split personality, Shinya, takes over. Shinya is the complete opposite of Mahiru, having an aggressive, hostile and almost unstable personality. It is hinted Shinya was born from abuse Mahiru experienced as a child, as she has a scar across her eye and is scared of bright lights. She is the eighth to be expelled after being knocked out. Following her expulsion, Mahiru lets go of Shinya, no longer needing her.

A mysterious man who is Tokaku's teacher. Kaiba is often seen rolling dice, and has a black-and-white motif and colour scheme. He sends riddles to Tokaku via her cellphone through the series. His teaching style is rude and brash.

Class Black's homeroom teacher; an eccentric, enthusiastic, and dedicated man who is unaware that the girls in his class are assassins. As the series goes on, he becomes doubtful in his skills as a teacher due to the amount of "transferals" of his students.

The chairwoman of the school and the supervisor of Class Black, who shares the same clan as Haru.

Media

Manga
Riddle Story of Devil is written by Yun Kōga and illustrated by Sunao Minakata. It was serialized in Kadokawa Shoten's Newtype magazine between the September 2012 and November 2016 issues. Kadokawa Shoten published five tankōbon volumes between July 9, 2013 and December 10, 2016. Seven Seas Entertainment released the series in North America from 2015 to 2016. The English version is available on Kadokawa's website BookWalker. A series of supplementary dōjinshi books, titled , have been released by Minakata and Akiko Morishima. Seven volumes have been released between December 29, 2014 and December 30, 2016.

Anime
An anime adaptation directed by Keizō Kusakawa and produced by Diomedéa aired in Japan between April 3, 2014 and June 19, 2014. The screenplay is written by Kiyoko Yoshimura and chief animation director Naomi Ide bases the character designs used in the anime on Sunao Minakata original designs. Episode 12 contains an insert song titled  sung by the main thirteen voice actresses. The series is licensed for streaming by Funimation in North America and Madman Entertainment in Australia, and is being simulcast by Crunchyroll outside of North America. Anime Limited acquired the series for a release in the United Kingdom, but they later announced that they cancelled the release. In Southeast Asia and South Asia, Muse Communication licensed the series and released it via Animax Asia. The company later began streaming the series on its Muse Asia YouTube channel.

References

External links
Anime official website 

2012 manga
2014 anime television series debuts
Action anime and manga
Anime series based on manga
Animeism
Diomedéa
Funimation
Japanese LGBT-related television shows
Kadokawa Shoten manga
Kadokawa Dwango franchises
Mainichi Broadcasting System original programming
Seinen manga
Seven Seas Entertainment titles
Yuri (genre) anime and manga
Muse Communication